The Zune Pad, which is a squircle, is the primary control mechanism for Zune 4, 8, 16, 80 and 120. The pad lets users of this device scroll through their song list with the use of their finger, then press the button to select tracks or change the volume.  

It was designed by Microsoft for the release of the second generation Zune.

Description and operation

The Zune Pad is about 24 mm in diameter and resembles a square like figure. It comprises a touch-sensitive button with simulated up, down, left, right and center navigational "button" response. It combines this touch interface with standard 5-way D-pad functionality. The Pad is capable of detecting movements in all directions. The user can press the top, bottom, left, right and center of the pad inward to navigate through lists or select an item or use the touch interface to move up, down, left and right. Selection is always done with a center click.

The user can touch and slide to move up or down on the screen. The motion of the select box on the screen is viewport-controlled where moving the finger up moves the view of the content up. This is unlike direct content manipulation interfaces, where moving the finger up moves the content up, equivalent to moving the viewport down the list. 

The Zune Pad allows the user to coast after flicking the list and to accelerate through the list with repeated flicks, unlike direct content manipulation interfaces in which a touch immediately grabs and stops the onscreen content. The user can thus move through a large list at high speed with just the flick gesture. Touching or clicking the Zune Pad will cause the coasting to stop.

It also allows the user to slide left and right to move through the menus at the top of the screen. The user can always click to navigate.  

There is no navigation function which can be performed only with the touch functions — the D-pad functionality is always sufficient.

Function
The Zune Pad is a capacitive touchpad and therefore detection is dependent upon using a finger. Directional pad functions are simulated by determining where the user's finger is when pressing the button. This works well unless the user is wearing gloves or anything that the touch surface cannot "read". The user cannot adjust the sensitivity and scroll speed, but can choose to turn it off and use the button as a standard directional pad instead.

See also 
 Click Wheel

External links
Zune.net
Official Zune Forums

Zune
Pointing devices